Asgiriya Stadium, is a cricket stadium situated in Kandy, Sri Lanka. Asgiriya Stadium is the private property of Trinity College, Kandy. It is around a 10-minute walk from the centre of the city. The venue would usually be used when an international team toured Sri Lanka for a Test Match.  Asgiriya became Sri Lanka's the second Test venue, after the Paikiasothy Saravanamuttu Stadium, when it hosted Greg Chappell’s Australian cricket team in Sri Lanka in 1982–83.

History
Prior to Asgiriya being built, Trinity College played their cricket at the Bogambara Stadium. In 1904 Rev. Alec Garden Fraser assumed office as Principal, he was conscious about the lack of a suitable playing space for the school and the lack of a cricket pitch. Fraser acquired an abandoned wasteland owned by the War Department, the site being at Asgiriya, 270 meters away from the school. The lease rental of the land at the time was Rs. 30 per year. In 1910 Trinity was given permission to build their own ground. The stadium broke ground in 1909 and was built until 1915.

The ground was opened ceremonially by the Governor, Sir Robert Chalmers, on 15 January 1915. The first inter-school match was between Trinity and S. Thomas' College, Mount Lavinia on 24 and 25 February 1915.

Before gaining Test status, one of the ICC requirements for Sri Lanka was to improve the infrastructure of its international venues. In 1981 the former Chairman of Sri Lanka Cricket, Gamini Dissanayake, an old Trinitian, took charge of upgrading Asgiriya into an international cricket stadium, which he did in a period of 150 days. On 5 January 1982 President J. R. Jayewardene ceremonially opened the stadium. Jayewardene also opened the pavilion in 1982.

The first cricket match at Asgiriya was against the Australian cricket team in Sri Lanka in 1982–83, becoming Sri Lanka's the second Test venue, after the Paikiasothy Saravanamuttu Stadium. Test matches were played regularly until the match against England in 2007-08. Sri Lanka won that Test, with Muttiah Muralitharan claiming his 709th Test wicket to go past Shane Warne as the highest wicket taker in Test cricket.

Sri Lanka's first Test win at Asgiriya came in 1998 against Zimbabwe, 15 years after the ground hosted its first Test. More success soon followed in the coming years as Sri Lanka won their first Test against Australia in 1999, which was Sri Lanka's first Test win against Australia; a game remembered for the dreadful collision between Steve Waugh and Jason Gillespie. Both players had to be airlifted to Colombo for medical treatment after being seriously injured. Waugh broke his nose while Gillespie had a broken bone in his shin.

Asgiriya has also hosted a 1996 Cricket World Cup fixture between Sri Lanka and Kenya, when Sri Lanka made 398, the highest World Cup score at the time and highest ODI team total until 400 passed.

Asgiriya Stadium has hosted a total of 22 Test Matches and seven of them have been won by Sri Lanka. Sri Lanka Cricket decided to shift all international cricket to Pallekele, about 15 kilometers from the city, but it is possible that Asgiriya will get an occasional international match.

In December 2014 it was announced that the stadium would be renovated and improved, with a new electronic scoreboard.

Distinction of the stadium
Surrounded by mountains in the ancient Sri Lankan hill capital of Kandy, Asgiriya is considered by ESPNcricinfo to be one of the most beautiful venues on earth.

The stadium has the unique distinction of being the only Test class cricket stadium in the world to be owned and maintained by a secondary school, Trinity College, Kandy an elite private boys school in Sri Lanka. Ranjan Madugalle, Ravi Ratnayeke, Nilantha Ratnayake, Kumar Sangakkara, and Kaushalya Weeraratne, Niroshan Dickwella all of whom represented Sri Lanka at the highest level at cricket, are but a few who honed their budding cricketing talents at Asgiriya whilst schoolboys at Trinity.

Ground figures

International Matches

Key

 P Matches Played
 H Matches Won by Home Side
 T Matches Won by Touring Side
 N Matches Won by Neutral Side
D/N/T Matches Drawn/No Result/Tied

Updated 4 September 2017

Key milestones

 1892 - Cricket is introduced at Trinity College
 1911 - Work on Trinity's Asgiriya grounds begins
 1915 - Robert Chalmers, G.C.B., declares open the new Asgiriya Playing field with its pavilion and gymnasium.
 1915 - The first inter-school cricket match to be played at Asgiriya takes place, between Trinity College, Kandy, and S. Thomas' College, Mount Lavinia. Trinity beat St Thomas' by an innings and 18 runs. Sir Robert Chalmers graces the occasion.
 1969 - Marylebone Cricket Club vs the Central Province in a 50 over match.
 1982 - Asgiriya becomes a Test Cricket Stadium
 1983 - First Test match takes place, between Sri Lanka and Australia
 1986 - First ODI takes place, between Sri Lanka and Pakistan
 1996 - Hosts a 1996 Cricket World Cup fixture between Sri Lanka national cricket team and Kenya national cricket team with Sri Lanka making a record 398, the highest score at the time.
 2001 - Sri Lanka cricketer Muttiah Muralitharan scored his only career half-century and his highest Test score of 67 against India at Kandy in 2001, including three sixes and five fours.

World Cup Cricket

1996 Cricket World Cup

See also
 List of Test cricket grounds
 Trinity college kandy
 Pallekele International Cricket Stadium

References

External links
 Cricinfo
 Asgiriya Stadium at CricketArchive
 "The ground which gave cricket Kumar Sangakkara" by Alan Gardner

Cricket grounds in Sri Lanka
Buildings and structures in Kandy
Test cricket grounds in Sri Lanka
Trinity College, Kandy
Sports venues in Central Province, Sri Lanka
1996 Cricket World Cup stadiums